Juraj Valach (born 1 February 1989) is a Slovak professional ice hockey defenceman who is currently playing for HK Spišská Nová Ves of the Slovak Extraliga.

Career
After playing for Piráti Chomutov for four seasons in the Czech Extraliga, Valach left as a free agent following the 2018–19 season, opting to sign his first contract in the EBEL, agreeing to a one-year deal with EHC Black Wings Linz on 1 July 2019.

Career statistics

Regular season and playoffs

International

Awards and honors

References

External links

1989 births
Living people
Expatriate ice hockey players in Austria
HC Kometa Brno players
HC Slavia Praha players
HKM Zvolen players
Ice hockey players at the 2018 Winter Olympics
Olympic ice hockey players of Slovakia
Sportspeople from Topoľčany
Piráti Chomutov players
Red Deer Rebels players
Regina Pats players
Slovak expatriate sportspeople in Austria
Slovak ice hockey defencemen
Tri-City Americans players
Vancouver Giants players
HC Slovan Bratislava players
HK Spišská Nová Ves players
Slovak expatriate ice hockey players in the United States
Slovak expatriate ice hockey players in the Czech Republic
Slovak expatriate ice hockey players in Canada